Ingrid Fernanda Villena Narbona (born 5 June 1990) is a Chilean lawyer who was elected as a member of the Chilean Constitutional Convention.

On 29 August 2021, she resigned to The List of the People.

References

External links
 BCN Profile

Living people
1991 births
Chilean women lawyers
21st-century Chilean politicians
Central University of Chile alumni
Members of the List of the People
Members of the Chilean Constitutional Convention
21st-century Chilean women politicians
People from Santiago
21st-century Chilean lawyers